From January 24 to June 6, 2000, voters of the Republican Party chose its nominee for president in the 2000 United States presidential election. Texas Governor George W. Bush was selected as the nominee through a series of primary elections and caucuses culminating in the 2000 Republican National Convention held from July 31 to August 3, 2000, in Philadelphia, Pennsylvania.

Campaign

The primary contest began with a fairly wide field, as the Republicans lacked an incumbent president or vice president. Texas Governor George W. Bush, son of George H. W. Bush, the most recent Republican president, took an early lead, with the support of much of the party establishment as well as a strong fund-raising effort. Former cabinet member George Shultz played an important early role in securing Republican support for Bush. In April 1998, he invited Bush to discuss policy issues with experts including Michael Boskin, John Taylor, and Condoleezza Rice. The group, which was "looking for a candidate for 2000 with good political instincts, someone they could work with," was impressed, and Shultz encouraged Bush to enter the race. Due in part to establishment backing, Bush dominated in early polling and fundraising figures. After stumbling in early primary debates, he easily won the Iowa caucuses.

Considered a dark horse, U.S. Senator John McCain of Arizona won 48% of the vote to Bush's 30% in the first-in-the-nation New Hampshire primary, giving his campaign a boost of energy and donations. Durham, New Hampshire was the site of an early debate between the Republican candidates.

Then, the main primary season came down to a race between Bush and McCain. McCain's campaign, centered on campaign finance reform, drew positive press coverage and a fair amount of public excitement, with polls giving the senator superior crossover support from independents and Democrats. Bush's campaign dealt with "compassionate conservatism," including a greater role for the federal government in education, subsidies for private charitable programs, and large reductions in income and capital gains taxes.

The next primary contest in South Carolina was notorious for its negative tone. Although the Bush campaign said it was not behind any attacks on McCain, locals supporting Bush reportedly handed out fliers and made telephone calls to prospective voters suggesting among other things, that McCain was a "Manchurian candidate" and that he had fathered a child out of wedlock with a black New York-based prostitute (an incorrect reference to Bridget McCain, a child he and his wife had adopted from Bangladesh). Bush also drew fire for a speech made at Bob Jones University, a school that still banned interracial dating among its students. But the governor was seen to have the upper hand in a debate hosted by Larry King Live, and he won in South Carolina by nine points. McCain won primaries in Michigan, his home state of Arizona, and the remaining New England states except for Maine, but faced difficulty in appealing to conservative Republican primary voters. This was particularly true in Michigan, where despite winning the primary, McCain lost the GOP vote to Bush by a wide margin. McCain also competed in the Virginia primary, counting on continued crossover support by giving a speech calling out Pat Robertson and Jerry Falwell, both leaders of the Christian right, for intolerance. It , and Bush won the state easily. Bush's subsequent Super Tuesday victories in California, New York and the South made it nearly impossible, mathematically, for McCain to catch up, and he suspended his campaign the next day.

Other candidates included social conservative activist Gary Bauer, businessman Steve Forbes, Utah Senator Orrin Hatch, former ECOSOC Ambassador and Assistant Secretary of State for International Organization Affairs Alan Keyes, former Tennessee Governor Lamar Alexander, former Red Cross director and cabinet member Elizabeth Dole, Ohio Congressman John Kasich, and former Vice President Dan Quayle. Bauer and Hatch campaigned on a traditional Republican platform of opposition to legalized abortion and reductions in taxes. Keyes had a far more conservative platform, calling for the elimination of all federal taxes except tariffs. Keyes also called for returning to ban homosexuals in the military, while most GOP candidates supported the "don't ask, don't tell" policy. Keyes continued participating in the campaign for nearly all the primaries and continued to appear in the debates with frontrunners McCain and Bush. As in 1996, Forbes campaigned on making the federal income tax non-graduated, an idea he called the flat tax, although he increased his focus on social conservatives in 2000. Although Forbes (who won a few states' primary contests in the 1996 primaries) came a close second to Bush in the Iowa caucuses and even tied with him in the Alaska caucuses, he nor any of these other candidates won a primary.

Candidates

Nominee

Withdrew at convention

Withdrew during primaries 

Other candidates campaigning for the nomination but receiving less than 1% of the national vote included:
Businessman Steve Forbes of New York
 Former Undersecretary of Education Gary Bauer
 United States Senator Orrin Hatch

Withdrew before primary elections
 Fmr. Governor Lamar Alexander of Tennessee
 Commentator and presidential candidate Pat Buchanan of Virginia (to run for the Reform Party nomination)
 Businessman Herman Cain of Nebraska
 Fmr. United States Secretary of Labor  Elizabeth Dole of North Carolina
 Representative John Kasich of Ohio (Campaign)
 Fmr. Vice President Dan Quayle of Indiana (Campaign)
 Senator Bob Smith of New Hampshire

Declined to run
 John Ashcroft, Senator from Missouri (ran for reelection) 
 Newt Gingrich, former Speaker of the United States House of Representatives
 Jack Kemp, former U.S. Representative from New York and nominee for vice-president in 1996
 George Pataki, Governor of New York
 Harold E. Stassen, former Governor of Minnesota
 Donald Trump, businessman (ran for Reform Party nomination); later became the 45th President of the United States
 Fred Thompson, Senator from Tennessee
 Tommy Thompson, Governor of Wisconsin
 Christine Todd Whitman, Governor of New Jersey

National polling

Results

Statewide

Nationwide
Popular vote result:
 George W. Bush – 12,034,676 (62.00%)
 John McCain – 6,061,332 (31.23%)
 Alan Keyes – 985,819 (5.08%)
 Steve Forbes – 171,860 (0.89%)
 Unpledged delegates – 61,246 (0.32%)
 Gary Bauer – 60,709 (0.31%)
 Orrin Hatch – 15,958 (0.08%)

Notable endorsements

Note: Some of the endorsers switched positions.

George W. Bush
Senate Majority Leader Trent Lott from Mississippi
Former HUD Secretary and 1996 Vice Presidential nominee Jack Kemp from New York
Senator Bob Smith from New Hampshire
Former Governor and White House Chief of Staff John H. Sununu of New Hampshire
Governor Jane Dee Hull of Arizona
Governor John Engler of Michigan
Senator John Warner from Virginia
Governor Jim Gilmore of Virginia
Senator John Ashcroft from Missouri
Governor Paul Cellucci of Massachusetts
Governor Tommy Thompson of Wisconsin
Representative John Thune from South Dakota

John McCain
Senator Jon Kyl from Arizona
Senator Fred Thompson of Tennessee
Senator Mike DeWine from Ohio
Senator Chuck Hagel from Nebraska
Representative Lindsey Graham from South Carolina
Representative Mark Sanford from South Carolina
Representative Peter T. King from New York
Staten Island Borough President Guy Molinari

Steve Forbes
Governor Gary Johnson of New Mexico
Representative Bob Barr from Georgia
Representative Roscoe Bartlett from Maryland
Ohio Secretary of State Ken Blackwell
Sarah Palin, mayor of Wasilla, Alaska

Alan Keyes
Representative Tom Coburn from Oklahoma
Filmmaker Michael Moore from Michigan (joke endorsement)

Orrin Hatch
Senator Robert Foster Bennett from Utah

Lamar Alexander
Governor Mike Huckabee of Arkansas
Former Governor Terry Branstad of Iowa

Dan Quayle
Former Governor Carroll A. Campbell of South Carolina

John Kasich
Mike DeWine (initially)
Senator George Voinovich from Ohio
Representative John Boehner from Ohio

See also
2000 Democratic Party presidential primaries

References